The University of the Amazon, also called Uniamazonía, is a national public university in Florencia, Caquetá, Colombia. The university is established by Act 60 of 1982 to contribute to the development of the Amazon region.

See also

 List of universities in Colombia

References

External links
 University of the Amazon official site 

Universities and colleges in Colombia
Educational institutions established in 1971
Florencia, Caquetá
Buildings and structures in Caquetá Department
1971 establishments in Colombia